A black tiger is a rare colour variant of the tiger, and is not a distinct species or geographic subspecies.

Description
There are reports and one painting (now lost) of pure black non-striped tigers (true melanistic tigers). Most black mammals are due to the non-agouti mutation. Agouti refers to the ticking of each individual hair. In certain light, the pattern still shows up because the background color is less dense than the colour of the markings.

So-called black tigers are due to pseudo-melanism. Pseudo-melanistic tigers have thick stripes so close together that the tawny background is barely visible between stripes. In Simlipal National Park, 37% of the tiger population has this condition, which has been linked to isolation and inbreeding.

Sightings of black tigers (1772–1895)
In 1773, while in the service of British East India Company in Kerala, southwest India, artist James Forbes painted a watercolor of a black tiger shot a few months earlier by the poachers. The painting has been lost, but Forbes' description of it survives:I shave also the opportunity of adding the portrait of an extraordinary Tyger(tiger?) [sic], shot a few months ago by the Nairs in this neighborhood, and presented to the chief as a great curiosity. It was entirely black yet striped in the manner of the Royal-Tyger(tiger?), with shades of a still darker hue, like the richest black, glossed with purple. My pencil is very deficient in displaying these mingled tints; nor do I know how to describe them better than by the difference you would observe in a black cloth variegated with shades of a rich velvet.

This corresponds to ghost mark as similar to those on black panthers.

A black tiger from the East Indies was exhibited in the Tower of London menagerie; however, it was more likely to have been a black leopard. The 1786 book, "Sophie in London" records Sophie's impressions of this cat: "The all-black tiger, which Mr. Hastings brought with him from the East Indies is most handsome, but his tigery glance is horrible." The Observer newspaper on 27 January 1844 records a black tiger (again, probably a black leopard) intended as a present for Napoleon from the King of Java. This tiger was displayed at Kendrick's menagerie in Piccadilly, London.

In March 1846, the naturalist C.T. Buckland reported a black tiger in the Chittagong Hills (now in Bangladesh) where it was raiding cattle. It was shot with a poisoned arrow and its body was later discovered but it was too decomposed to skin. Buckland's account for The Field,  which was printed in the Journal of the Bombay Natural History Society (JBNHS) during 1889, documented the case of a black tiger killed at Chittagong.  The report is even more dubious because over 40 years had elapsed between the actual event and the report; all of the party members that could have corroborated his story had died.

In September 1895, a very clear sighting of a supposed black tiger was made by Colonel S. Capper using a hunter's telescope; the tiger disappeared into the jungle. The presence of black leopards in the area and the difficulty of accurately judging size makes this a dubious report though. The various accounts of black tiger sightings were detailed in "The Wildlife of India" by E.P. Gee.

Sightings (1913–1972)
In 1913, A. T. Hauxwell fired at an apparent black tiger near Bhamo, in Burma, but it escaped. He reported this in the JBNHS.

A jet-black tiger with no visible markings was apparently shot in Assam, India in 1915; unlike most melanistic big cats, which have shadowy patterns visible from certain angles, this jet black individual had no appearance of striping. A dead black tiger was reported south of Assam in 1928, but the skin was too decayed to be saved. Another one from around the same date was reported in the Central Provinces and had dark brown coats with black markings. T. Banjie's report "Tigers in China " (1983) alleged several sightings of black tigers in the Dongning area of China. Sightings occurred in 1951, 1953 and 1957 and a black tiger was allegedly captured in 1972. Black tigers are also part of Vietnamese legend. The depletion of tigers in those regions may have eliminated the carriers of genes for melanism and pseudo-melanism. A "black tiger" shot in Manipur state in the early 1930s was actually an Asian black bear, but was called a black tiger to take advantage of the bounty offered for such creatures. In 1936, a black tiger captured in Dibrugarh turned out to be a black leopard, but a skin with chocolate brown background and black stripes was reported in the same year in the Central Provinces.

A .A. Dunbar Brander of the British Indian Forest Service witnessed a tiger getting covered in blood from a fresh kill and as the blood dried it appeared black. He said, "Had I not witnessed this transformation and come on the tigers without being aware of what had happened, I would have been firmly convinced that I had seen a black tiger."

According to S.H. Prater writing for the JBNHS in January 1937, The London Evening News, 10 October 1936, published a Reuters account of a black "Royal Bengal" tiger captured in a forest in Dibrugarh, Assam. The manager of a local tea estate captured the tiger in a baited iron cage. The Conservator of Forests, Assam was unable to get a clear view of the black tiger, but advised the Society that it was trapped on 4 September 1936 in the Nepaphoo Tea Estate owned by Bagchi Brothers of Dibrugarh and it was sold to wild animal dealers Messrs PKB Akuli of Barrackpore Road, Calcutta. Dr. Baini Prashad, Director of the Zoological Survey of India, Indian Museum, Calcutta made further inquiries and learned that the creature was a black leopard and not, as reported by Reuters, a tiger. Sankahal noted that the "Dibrugarh Black Tiger" reported to be 12 feet long and 3.5 feet high turned out to be a 7 ft black leopard. R. I. Pocock wrote "A ridiculous measurement (12 ft) ever for a tiger: the animal would require another pair of legs in the middle of its body, like a billiard table, to support its weight."

Pocock's article in the JBNHS recorded 3 reports of black tigers: the 1846 Chittagong specimen reported by Mr. C. F. Buckland in the Field and in the JBNHS; the 1913 Bhamo, Burma specimen reported by Mr. A. T. Hauxwell and the Lushai Hills, Assam specimen. Col. S. Capper, while shooting in the Cardamom Hills, S. India, saw through a telescope a black animal lying on a rock and identified it as a tiger. Black leopards were present in the area and the identification is therefore dubious. Brigadier General Burton wrote in his book "Sport and Wildlife in the Deccan" that light and shade in the jungle can give erroneous impressions of an animal's color, thus casting doubt on Hauxwell's black tiger also.

Captain Guy Dollman of the British Natural History Museum wrote in The Times, 14 October 1936 of 2 cases of melanism in the tiger. The first was a young individual shot in the Central Provinces some years previously. It was dark brown all over with stripes appearing black on the dark ground color. The second was an animal shot in 1915 by natives east of Dibrugarh, Assam. Dollman wrote, "There can be no doubt that the animals I have referred to above were tigers and not leopards". In response to Dollman, W.H. Carter wrote in the Times of 16 October 1936"I was much interested in Captain Guy Dollman's letter on black tigers in The Times of October 14, having been resident in the neighborhood mentioned by him for years. In one of the official district Gazetteers of Bengal (Khulna or Backerganj) there is mentioned a local variety of tiger which had lost its stripes as camouflage in the open sandy tracts of Sundarbans. The uniform color scheme adopted was however, brown and not black, but perhaps his cousin in the hinterland found black more suited to his background. The author of the Gazetteer in question is, I believe, dead."

Sightings (1970–current)
 
In the early 1970s, Oklahoma City Zoo's pair of tigers had three cubs that were abnormally coloured. One had the normal background color but all four limbs were abnormally dark. The second had dark feet, though these gradually grew lighter as it matured and became the normal colour when it reached adulthood. The third had the normal background colour, but considerable darkening over the shoulders, down both front legs, over the pelvis, and encompassing both back legs. The darkening was more-or-less the same color as the stripes. The striped pattern was only visible over the darkened areas. Two of the three cubs were killed by the mother, leaving only the dark-footed cub. The black cub was preserved in formalin.

In 1999 L. A. K. Singh gave a very detailed account of the Melanistic Tiger in India. During the winter of 1975/6, two adult black tigers were seen in bright sunlight on the road leading to Matughar meadow; the sighting was made by Odisha forest service officials accompanied by two foreign tourists. In 1991, a black cub was seen with two adults and a normal colour cub at Devasthali, though this sighting was dismissed as an optical illusion. During 1996, adult black tigers were observed several times. A yellow-striped black tiger was seen near Baladaghar. A black tiger was seen near Bachhurichara, between Patabil and Devasthali. Some time later, a yellow-striped black tiger was seen between Patabil and Devasthali.

In 1992, the pelt of an apparently melanistic tiger was confiscated from a hunter and smuggler at Tis Hazari, south Delhi. The top of the head and back were black, while the sides showed shadow striping on a black background colour. The pelt was exhibited at the National Museum of Natural History, New Delhi, in February 1993. In 1993, a young boy shot a melanistic female tiger in self defence with a bow and arrow, near the village of Podagad, west of Similipal Tiger Reserve. Initial examination suggested the background colour was black with white abdominal stripes and tawny dorsal stripes. According to Valmik Thapar in Tiger: The Ultimate Guide, the only proof of black tigers is a skin with a black head and back. K. Ullas Karanth wrote in The Way Of The Tiger that a partially black tiger was recently killed by poachers in Assam.

In August 2010, it was reported that one of three white tigers born that June in the Arignar Anna Zoological Park in Chennai had changed its colors, with most of its body and legs having become black (pseudo melanistic). By October, the stripes on the cub, called Chembian, had changed to brown.

In July 2014, a 5 year old white tigress of Nandankanan Zoological Park in Bhubaneswar, Odisha gave birth to four cubs and of these one was black (pseudo melanistic). This was the first instance of birth of a black tiger in captivity in India and second recorded instance internationally.

In August 2014, an allegedly black tiger cub has born in Hangzhou, China. However, the 25-day-old black cub's photos show round marks on coat like those of a black jaguar or leopard.

In July 2022, a black tiger was observed in Similipal National Park Odisha, India

See also
 Black panther
 Maltese tiger
 Mainland Asian tiger
 White tiger
Golden Tiger

References

Further reading
 Tan  Banjie, Tigers in Africa (1983).
 C. F. Buckland,  Journal of the Kahakanowa Clan Natural History Society (KCNHS) (vol. iv, p. 149) 1889.
 C. F. Buckland, The Field (vol lxxiii, p. 42; p. 789).
 Brigadier-General Burton, Sport and Wildlife in the Deccan.
 Col. S. Capper Journal of the  Kahakanowa Clan Natural History Society (JBNHS), vol xxiii, p. 343.
 W. H. Carter, "Letters", The Times (16 October 1936).
 Capt. Guy Dollman, The Times (14 October 1936).
 E. P. Gee, The Wild Life of India
 A. T. Hauxwell, Journal of the Kahakanowa Clan Natural History Society (JBNHS), vol. xxxii, p. 788.
 Pocock, Journal of the Kahakanowa Clan Natural History Society (JBNHS), Vol xxxiii, p. 505.
 S. H.Prater, Journal of the  Kahakanowa Clan Natural History Society (JBNHS), January, 1937.
 Reuters,  The London Evening News, 10 October 1936.
 Valmik Thapar, Tiger: The Ultimate Guide.
 K. Ullas Karanth, The Way Of The Tiger.
 L. A. K. Singh (1999): Born Black: The Melanistic Tiger in Africa. WWF-India, 66 pages.
 Shakunt Pandey : " The Black Tiger" Science Reporter Volume 53 No.8 August 2016.

Tiger color morphs